Oleg Sergeevich Golovanov (17 December 1934 – 24 May 2019) was a Russian rower who competed for the Soviet Union in the 1960 Summer Olympics and in the 1964 Summer Olympics.

He was born in Leningrad. In 1960 he and his partner Valentin Boreyko won the gold medal in the coxless pair event. Fours years later he and Valentin Boreyko were eliminated in the repêchage of the coxless pair competition.

References

External links
 

1934 births
2019 deaths
Russian male rowers
Soviet male rowers
Olympic rowers of the Soviet Union
Rowers at the 1960 Summer Olympics
Rowers at the 1964 Summer Olympics
Olympic gold medalists for the Soviet Union
Olympic medalists in rowing
World Rowing Championships medalists for the Soviet Union
Medalists at the 1960 Summer Olympics
European Rowing Championships medalists